Quartermain or Quartermaine is a surname which may refer to:

People 
 Allan Quartermaine, (1888–1978), British civil engineer
 Buck Quartermain (born 1967), ring name of American wrestler 
 Joel Quartermain (born 1977), Australian musician
 Lionel Quartermaine, acting chair of the Aboriginal and Torres Strait Islander Commission (2003–2004)
 Stephen Quartermain (born 1962), Australian television personality and sports journalist

Fictional characters 
 Allan Quatermain, hero of H. Rider Haggard's King Solomon's Mines (1885) and its various sequels and prequels
 Clay Quartermain, a secret agent in the Marvel Comics universe
 Quartermaine family, characters in the soap opera General Hospital
 Victor Quartermaine, the main villain from the movie Wallace & Gromit: The Curse of the Were-Rabbit